Shen Daren (August 1928 – August 2, 2017) was a Chinese politician from Jiangsu province. He was best known for his terms as the Communist Party Secretary of Ningxia between 1986 and 1989 and party secretary of his home province between 1989 and 1993.

Biography
Shen grew up in Changzhou, Jiangsu. He began work as a technician at a textiles factory, where he rose through the ranks to become a supervisor, then deputy head of the factory. In 1960, he entered the apparat, serving in the textiles department of the city of Changzhou. In 1968, during the Cultural Revolution, he became Revolutionary Committee head of the Changzhou department of textiles industry. Following the Cultural Revolution, he was promoted to deputy party chief of Changzhou, then mayor, and then party chief. In 1983, he was elevated further to become Deputy Party Secretary of Jiangsu province. Three years later, he became party chief of the Ningxia Hui Autonomous Region.

In December 1989, Shen was transferred back to Jiangsu to become party chief of his home province. He assumed the post of the Chairman of the Jiangsu People's Congress in 1993. 

Shen was a delegate to the 8th National People's Congress (1993–1998) and 9th National People's Congress (1998–2003).

Shen died on August 2, 2017 in Nanjing. The party assigned him standard honors of a deceased comrade. In his official obituary, the party mentioned his "commitment to party unity" during the "political storm between the spring and summer of 1989", a euphemism for the democracy movement. His funeral was attended by Jiangsu party chief Li Qiang and Governor Wu Zhenglong; he received wreaths and condolences from Xi Jinping, Li Keqiang, Jiang Zemin, Hu Jintao, Li Peng and his wife Zhu Lin, and a long list of other retired and incumbent officials.

References

1928 births
2017 deaths
Politicians from Changzhou
People's Republic of China politicians from Jiangsu
Chinese Communist Party politicians from Jiangsu
Delegates to the 8th National People's Congress
Delegates to the 9th National People's Congress